Tetramorium mayri is a species of ant in the genus Tetramorium. It is endemic to India.

References

Insects of India
mayri
Hymenoptera of Asia
Endemic fauna of India
Insects described in 1912
Taxonomy articles created by Polbot
Taxobox binomials not recognized by IUCN